The suicide of two Taipei First Girls' High School students happened in Yilan County, Taiwan in 1994. The two school girls were called Lin Qinghui and Shi Jiya, Grade 2. They went together to a motel in Su'ao Town, Yilan County and committed suicide by burning charcoal with insufficient ventilation. Their bodies as well as the suicide note were found by the motel staff at noon on 25 July 1994. The staff then called the police. The suicide of the two school girls was one of the biggest social news events of the year in Taiwan. There was no clue found about the motivation of the suicides in the suicide note. Their parents also thought they had no reason to do so. News media once speculated that the tragedy resulted from the complex feelings of being lesbians.

Background 
Lin Qinghui (18-year-old, Taipei County, Xinzhuang City) and Shi Jiya (17-year-old, Taipei City) were second year students at Taipei First Girls' High School. They were both in a gifted science class called the Liang (14th) class. Jiya Shi was the conductor of the school orchestra and had a good academic record. The school planned on sending her to participate in the International Mathematical Olympiad. Qinghui Lin was a member of the school basketball team and also a talented chemistry student. The two girls were good friends and planned to undertake individual studies with by professors of Chemistry and Mathematics in National Taiwan University over the upcoming holiday. 

On 23 July 1994, the two girls left home for Jindu Motel in front of Su'ao Station of Yilan County. At noon on 25 July, the motel staff found their bodies in the bathroom together with a suicide note. When Liao Songyun, the prosecutor and Dong Xirong, the medical examiner of Yilan District Prosecutors Office came to the spot, they found burned charcoal in the bathroom; the door and window had been sealed. There was no sign of a struggle or poison. They died of carbon monoxide poisoning and asphyxia. The prosecutor deduced that the two girls committed suicide together late at night on 23 July.

Suicide note 
The suicide note was written by both girls in three paragraphs.

Cultural references 
Ruohui Yang, an ACG researcher thought that Lianfang Shen's yuri comic book Always Be with You, published in 1997, drew inspiration from the suicide case in question.

Notes

References 
 Renjian Guan, A Taiwan Unknown to You．Mysterious Cases in Campus, Wenjing Press, 01-06-2012,  
 Ruohui Yang. Girls' Love：Yuri Culture in Animation, Comic and Games in Taiwan(WJPF0154). Reading Times Website.

1994 in Taiwan
Suicides in Taiwan
Suicides by carbon monoxide poisoning
July 1994 events in Asia
1994 suicides